The Spanish nobles María Lourdes de Urquijo, 5th Marchioness of Urquijo and Grandee of Spain, and her husband Manuel de la Sierra, were murdered in their Madrid home on 1 August 1980. Their son-in-law Rafael Escobedo was convicted of the crime, and later committed suicide in prison. Escobedo's friend Javier Anastasio de Espona fled before being brought to trial, but much later asserted his innocence.

Events
The main suspect, and the only person convicted for the crime, was Rafael Escobedo (1955–1988). He had married Miriam de la Sierra y Urquijo, daughter of the Marquesses, on 21 June 1978. The relationship deteriorated and in 1979 Miriam formed a relationship with Richard Dennis Rew, known as "Dick the American". The Marquess was owner of Banco Urquijo, whose shares were plummeting at the time.

During the night of 1 August 1980, the Marquesses of Urquijo were shot to death, while they slept at their palace in Somosaguas near Madrid. On 8 April 1981, Escobedo was arrested and confessed to police, after some pistol cartridges were discovered at a property belonging to his father and appeared identical with those used to kill the Marquesses. The next day, Javier Anastasio de Espona, a friend of Escobedo, and Diego Martínez Herrera, butler to the Urquijos, separately travelled in haste to London, where Juan, the son of the Marquesses and Miriam's younger brother, was living.

The disappearance of the cartridges complicated the progress of Escobedo's trial. In July 1983, however, Escobedo was found guilty and sentenced to 53 years in prison, and the sentence was confirmed by the Supreme Court of Spain in 1985. Escobedo maintained his innocence, accusing Anastasio of the crime, until his death in the prison of El Dueso on 27 July 1988. The proceedings arising from this event fell to the then Judge of Santoña, Fernando Grande Marlaska.

The gun was not found by the authorities, although it is believed to have been a .22 caliber model made by Star Bonifacio Echeverria in Éibar. This type of weapon is a collectors' item, since only a small number (estimated as 22–24) were manufactured.

Javier Anastasio had been detained in January 1983 and his trial as participant in the murder was set for 21 January 1988. However, a month before the trial he escaped to Brazil via Portugal, and since then his whereabouts have been unknown. The only sighting of him was seven years afterwards, when he was interviewed for television by Jesús Quintero in Brazil. In May 2010 the charges against him were withdrawn and the case was closed under the statute of limitations, 30 years having passed since the crime.

In February 1990, Mauricio López-Roberts y Melgar, Marquess of Torrehermosa, was sentenced to ten years in prison for obstruction of justice.

In 2010 Anastasio was interviewed for the first time for the magazine Vanity Fair in Buenos Aires. He denied having committed the crime.

Repercussions
The Spanish media have accorded this murder more coverage than most other crime stories of any period. Hundreds of pages of press coverage appeared after the murder, during the trial, and after the suicide of the convict. Several books have been published about the case, among them Con un crimen al hombro. Yo maté a los marqueses de Urquijo ("With a crime on my shoulder: I killed the Marquesses of Urquijo": 1994), a biography of Escobedo by Matías Antolín, a personal friend.

The case also inspired the film Solo o en compañía de otros ("Alone or in company": 1991), with Juan Ribó and Ana Álvarez, and an episode The crime of the Marquesses of Urquijo (2010) in the television series The footprint of the crime, on Televisión Española.

References

External links
 Murder of the Marquesses of Urquijo
 Dossier of the event, RTVE.

1980 in Spain
Assassinated nobility
Assassinations in Spain
Deaths by firearm in Spain
1980 murders in Spain